Aleksandr Andreyevich Novikov (born 2 July 2002) is a Russian football player. He plays for FC Dynamo Bryansk.

Club career
He made his debut in the Russian Football National League for FC Dynamo Bryansk on 19 September 2020 in a game against FC Tekstilshchik Ivanovo.

References

External links
 Profile by Russian Football National League
 

2002 births
Living people
Russian footballers
Association football midfielders
FC Dynamo Bryansk players